Natalie Exon (born 7 December 1992) is an Australian rules footballer playing for St Kilda in the AFL Women's.

Early life
Exon was born in 1992. She was playing for the Darebin Falcons when she was drafted.

AFL Women's career
Exon was recruited by Carlton as a rookie player before the 2017 season. She made her debut in the Blues' inaugural game against Collingwood at Princes Park on 3 February 2017.
Exon's brother, Ryan, plays for the Coburg Lions in the men's VFL.

On 25 May 2017, Exon was, along with Bella Ayre, traded to Brisbane in a complex trade involving four teams, five players, and a draft pick.

In April 2019, Exon joined expansion club St Kilda along with fellow Brisbane player Kate McCarthy. It was revealed Exon had signed on with the Saints for one more year on 30 June 2021, tying her to the club until the end of the 2021/2022 season.

References

External links

1992 births
Living people
Sportswomen from Victoria (Australia)
Australian rules footballers from Victoria (Australia)
Carlton Football Club (AFLW) players
Brisbane Lions (AFLW) players
Darebin Falcons players
St Kilda Football Club (AFLW) players